This is a list of universities in Botswana.
Botho University
Botswana Accountancy College
Botswana University of Agriculture and Natural Resources
Botswana International University of Science and Technology
Limkokwing University of Creative Technology
University of Botswana

Botswana Open University (formerly BOCODOL)

References 

Universities
Botswana

Botswana